A film production company is a company that generally produces, creates and distributes motion pictures (films), musics or other programmes by their own subsidiary companies. It produces video content for television, social media, corporate promotions, commercials and other media-related fields. This is a list of notable film production houses, distributors and music studios situated or headquartered in India.

Active film production houses

Music studios

Film distributors

Closed film producing companies
Bombay Talkies, closed in 1953
R. K. Films, closed in 2019

See also
Cinema of India

References

Production companies